Perry Carlton "Buddy" Buie (January 23, 1941 – July 18, 2015) was an American songwriter, producer and publisher. He is most commonly associated with Roy Orbison, the Classics IV and the Atlanta Rhythm Section.

Career
Buie was born in Marianna, Florida and raised in Dothan, Alabama. He was at high school with Bobby Goldsboro and managed his band The Webbs. He introduced The Webbs to Roy Orbison in a show Buie organized and they became their backup band for two-and-a-half years.

He was best known as a prolific songwriter, with 340 songs registered in the BMI catalog. His first success came in 1964 when Tommy Roe took "Party Girl", which Buie co-wrote with Billy Gilmore, into the Billboard Hot 100. In 1967, he started working with the group Classics IV, writing with the group's guitarist, James Cobb, to add lyrics to Mike Sharpe's instrumental "Spooky". Subsequent songs co-written with Cobb included Sandy Posey's "I Take It Back" and the Classics IV hits "Stormy", "Traces", "Every Day With You Girl" and "What Am I Crying For?"

He assembled the Atlanta Rhythm Section with former members of the Candymen and Classics IV in 1971. He served as manager of the band and co-wrote most of their songs, including "So in to You", "I'm Not Gonna Let It Bother Me Tonight" and "Imaginary Lover".

In 1978, Buie and marketing executive Arnie Geller founded the recording management company Buie/Geller Organization, and Polydor imprint BGO Records in Doraville, Georgia.

Buie was inducted into the Georgia Music Hall of Fame in 1984 and the Alabama Music Hall of Fame in 1997.

In 2003, Buie left Atlanta and retired to Eufaula, Alabama.

In 2010, the Oscar-winning film The Fighter featured "So Into You" by the Atlanta Rhythm Section on its soundtrack. 

On July 18, 2015, Buie died at a hospital in Dothan, Alabama after suffering a heart attack.

See also
 Southern rock

References

External links
 
 Buddy Buie at BMI Repertoire
 

1941 births
2015 deaths
American music publishers (people)
people from Dothan, Alabama
people from Marianna, Florida
record producers from Alabama
songwriters from Alabama